John Law was a Hong Kong film director and screenwriter best known for his films of the 1970s.Law is credited with 10 films as an actor, 35 films as a director, 15 films as a writer and 7 films as a producer.

Early life 
On November 4, 1938, Law was born in Taiwan.

Career 
In 1957, Law started his acting career in Hong Kong. Law first appeared in He Has Taken Him for Another, a 1957 Mandarin Comedy film directed by Li Han-Hsiang. Law also appeared in The Lady of Mystery, a 1957 Mandarin thriller film directed by 	Wa Hak-Ngai.

Law wrote the script for the 1961 film The Search Of Loved One  but by 1968 he had moved into directing and writing, directing his first film in this year entitled A Time for Reunion , a film which starred Alan Tang who would feature in many of his later films in the 1970s.

In the 1970s, John began working under the renowned Hong Kong film studios, Shaw Studio, responsible for producing many of Hong Kong's classic martial arts film during this period. In 1976 John directed and wrote the script for The Girlie Bar, an adult film oriented drama featuring Chan Ping, Yau Fung, Lin Chen Chi and James Nam and Tony Liu. Similarly his film later that year Bruce Lee and I starred Betty Ting, Danny Lee, Yuen Cheung and Tony Liu. His 1977 romance film Orchid In The Rain, which also starred frequent star in his films, Alan Tang, Brigitte Lin also pushed boundaries in terms of intimacy on screen. 
He would however, direct several kung fu films, notably in 1979 the films Monkey Kung Fu and
Five Super Fighters, and Boxer From The Temple  in 1981. Boxer From The Temple was to be his last film as a director and under Shaw Studios.
Law is credited with 10 films as an actor, 35 films as a director, 15 films as a writer and 7 films as a producer.

Filmography
The Lady Of Mystery (1957) -Actor
The Search Of Loved One (1961) -Writer
The Black Fox (1962) -Actor
The Love Eterne (1963) -Actor
The Empress Wu Tse-Tien (1963) - Actor
A Time for Reunion (1968) Director and Writer
Red Light, Green Light (1969) -Director
Miss Not Home (1970) -Director and Writer
Money and I (1971) -Director and Writer
Maria (1971) -Director, -Writer
Bus Stop (1971) Director, -Writer
Black List (1972) Director, -Writer
Tiger (1973) Director, -Writer
Black Guide (1973) -Director and Writer
Back Street (1973) -Director
The Crazy Bumpkins (1974) -Director
Thief Of Thieves (1975)- Director
Return Of The Crazy Bumpkin (1975)- Director
The Happy Trio (1975) -Director
The Girlie Bar (1976) -Director, Original Story
Crazy Bumpkin In Singapore (1976) -Director
Bruce Lee And I (1976) -Director and Lyricist
Big Times For The Crazy Bumpkins (1976) -Director and Writer
Orchid In The Rain (1977) -Director
Forever and Ever (1977) -Director
 1978 To Love Or Not To Love -Director
 1978 The Chase  - Director
 1979 Monkey Kung Fu (aka Stroke of Death) - Director, screenwriter.
 1979 Five Super Fighters -Director
 1979 Busting Prostitution Rackets -Director
Young Outcasts (1980) -Director
Boxer From The Temple (1981) -Director
The Black Sheep (1983) -Writer

References

External links
 
HKcinemagic
 John Law Ma at letterboxd.com

Hong Kong film directors
Living people
1938 births